Teasley is a surname. Notable people with the surname include:

Brian Teasley, American musician
Jerome Teasley (1948–2016), American soul drummer 
Lisa Teasley (born 1964), American writer and artist
Nikki Teasley (born 1979), American basketball player
Sam Teasley (born 1976), American politician

Fictional characters
Yvonne Teasley, a character in Beverly Hills, 90210, played by Denise Dowse

English-language surnames
Surnames of British Isles origin